The African dormice (genus Graphiurus) are dormice that live throughout sub-Saharan Africa in a variety of habitats. They are very agile climbers and have bushy tails. They eat invertebrates and small vertebrates.

Species
Genus Graphiurus, African dormice
Angolan African dormouse, Graphiurus angolensis
Christy's dormouse, Graphiurus christyi
Jentink's dormouse, Graphiurus crassicaudatus
Johnston's African dormouse, Graphiurus johnstoni
Kellen's dormouse, Graphiurus kelleni
Lorrain dormouse, Graphiurus lorraineus
Small-eared dormouse, Graphiurus microtis
Monard's dormouse, Graphiurus monardi
Woodland dormouse, Graphiurus murinus
Nagtglas's African dormouse, Graphiurus nagtglasii
Spectacled dormouse, Graphiurus ocularis
Rock dormouse, Graphiurus platyops
Stone dormouse, Graphiurus rupicola
Silent dormouse, Graphiurus surdus
Graphiurus walterverheyeni

Gallery

References

 
Rodent genera